Germanodactylidae is a controversial group of pterosaurs within the suborder Pterodactyloidea. It was first named by Yang Zhongjian in 1964, and given a formal phylogenetic definition in 2014 by Brian Andres, James Clark, and Xu Xing. They defined it as the least inclusive clade containing Germanodactylus cristatus and Normannognathus wellnhoferi, which they considered to be close relatives at the time. However, more recent studies by the same researchers have found that these pterosaurs may be only distantly related.

Studies performed in the 2000s suggested this group it contained three genera: Germanodactylus, Normannognathus and Tendaguripterus. Various studies have since placed these pterosaurs within the larger clades Archaeopterodactyloidea, Eupterodactyloidea, or  Dsungaripteroidea, though it has also been recovered within the Ctenochasmatoidea. In several 2010s studies, the supposed "germanodactylid" species were not necessarily found to form a natural group with each other, and even the genus Germanodactylus itself was discovered to be likely paraphyletic, causing one of its component species to be renamed Altmuehlopterus. This would render the name Germanodactylidae synonymous with some other clade, such as Archaeopterodactyloidea or Lophocratia.

Korean Late Cretaceous pterosaur tracks have been interpreted as belonging to a Germanodactylus-like taxon.

Classification
Below is a cladogram showing the results of a phylogenetic analysis presented by Longrich, Martill, and Andres, 2018.

References

Pterodactyloids
Prehistoric reptile families